Kiss of the Damned is a 2012 American vampire horror film, written and directed by Xan Cassavetes. The film played at the 2013 SXSW Film Festival and was released in theaters on May 3, 2013. The filming locations were New York City and New Fairfield, Connecticut.

Plot
Paolo, a screenwriter staying in Connecticut to write a screenplay, meets and falls in love with Djuna, only to discover that she is a vampire who survives by consuming the blood of animals. Djuna confesses to Paolo, but he refuses to believe her, so she asks him to chain her to the bed so she can prove it to him. Revealed in her true form, Paolo is unafraid and releases her from the chains and they have sex. As the two reach climax, Paolo receives Djuna's "kiss of death" and is turned into a vampire. The two continue to live in Djuna's large summer house which is actually owned by Xenia, a leader in the vampire community and theatre actress. It is a halfway house for vampires in Xenia's community.

Their life as a couple is disturbed by the arrival of Mimi, Djuna's out of control sister, who has come to live at the house after she killed a man in Amsterdam. Mimi claims she only plans on staying a week and proceeds to cause chaos in their lives. She feeds on human after human, which is forbidden in their community, seduces Paolo, and offers Xenia a virgin, Anne, who is a fan of Xenia's theatre work. Meanwhile, the housekeeper Irene, whose family have been the caretakers of the summer house for generations, suffers from a hereditary blood disorder that makes her blood undesirable to vampires. She overhears Djuna telling Xenia that Mimi has been attacking humans, although Xenia tries to deny it.

Mimi recklessly drives her car towards the house before losing control and crashing. Dawn approaches while Mimi is still strapped in the car. She wakes up and races to the house, only to fall short within sight but already burning from the sun. She sees Irene and begs her to help, but Irene ignores her desperate plea and pulls a cigarette out and lights it from Mimi before smoking it. Paolo and Djuna are preparing to leave the summer house as Paolo states how they're set to go stay with their friends in Italy. As they leave the house, a black trash bag near the entrance tips over. Djuna, Paolo, and Irene look back at it, find nothing of interest, and continue on their way.

Cast
 Josephine de La Baume as Djuna
 Tiarnie Coupland as Young Djuna
 Milo Ventimiglia as Paolo
 Roxane Mesquida as Mimi
 Olivia Lauletta as Young Mimi
 Anna Mouglalis as Xenia
 Michael Rapaport as Ben
 Peter Vack as Adam
 Riley Keough as Anne
 Ching Valdes-Aran as Irene Pola

Reception

Critical response
On Rotten Tomatoes it has a score of 61% based on 33 reviews. The site's consensus reads: "This one bites in a mostly good way: Kiss of the Damned is an erotic gorefest reminiscent of gaudy 70's horror flicks, presented in plain packaging and not meant for direct sunlight".

It is most often referred to as inspired by the Gothic vampire movies of the 1970s.

Accolades
In September 2013, the film won the Octopus d’Or for the best international feature film at the Strasbourg European Fantastic Film Festival.

See also
 Vampire film

References

External links
 
 

2012 films
2012 horror films
American vampire films
Films set in Connecticut
Films shot in Connecticut
Films shot in New York City
2010s English-language films
2010s American films